Billy Block (born William Donald Block; August 10, 1955 – March 11, 2015) also known as Mr. Nashville, was a musician, journalist, actor, publisher, television and radio personality. Block was a tireless promoter of independent musicians, primary in the Alternative country - Americana genres. He hosted Billy Block's Western Beat, a live concert-format radio show for over thirty years.

Background
At age 15, Block worked around his school schedule in a music store and playing clubs in the  Houston, Texas area with artists: Shake Russell, B.W. Stevenson, Roger Tause and Billy Joe Shaver. Huey Mo hired Block at Sugar Hill Studios where he played drums on two Freddy Fender albums.  Block was also the Houston editor of Buddy Magazine.

In 1985, Block moved to Venice, California, he landed a job as the house drummer for the Palomino Club for the Ronnie Mack Barn Dance show in 1987, he held the job until his departure to Nashville in 1995. Block also worked as a bandleader, actor, dancer and singer at The Walt Disney Company. A national commercial for Disney led to additional commercials for Carrows Restaurants, Miller beer and Kentucky Fried Chicken.

In 1991, Block met and married his wife Jill Rochlitz, and Western Beat was created at the Highland Grounds coffee house in Hollywood in the same year. The first Western Beat show included: Wendy Waldman, Rick Vincent, Jim Lauderdale, slide guitarist Jimmy Sloan, Mandy Mercier and Annie Harvey among others.

Western Beat

Increasing the show's reach in 1993, Western Beat hosted a showcase of Los Angeles artists at the Wildhorse Saloon in Nashville. By 1995, Billy and Jill were interested in owning a home and starting a family, they were considering Nashville. Block had been writing for Music Connection magazine for six years, and his band, the Zydeco Party Band, was calling it quits, Block took a writing gig at Music Row Magazine in 1995.

"It was a great place to start in Nashville, because Music Row Magazine is the epicenter of the industry. All the information about everything comes through that office. [...]  Working there put me on the fast track into the very heart of Nashville. Six months into my tenure at Music Row, I got a call from Woody Bomar to start doing some sessions with John Scott Sherrill." 
—Billy Block,  "A Conversation with Billy Block, Western Beat Impresario", by Frank Goodman, September 2001.

In 1999, Billy Block's Western Beat Roots Revival began airing on Saturday nights on WSIX-FM Nashville, the five hour show previously aired on Power Country 102.9 (WZPC) until the station moved to a rock format.

Western Beat With Billy Block premiered on Country Music Television (CMT) on July 2, 2003, featuring guest performers, Trisha Yearwood, Allison Moorer and Lonesome Bob. The show was short lived, other artists included: Gary Allan, Hank Williams III, The Derailers, Michael McDonald, Buddy and Julie Miller, Ralph Stanley, Allison Moorer, BR549 and Kevin Gordon.

Death 
Block's death at age 59 in 2015 was a shock to the community. His fight with cancer was documented in Nashville Scene magazine, he was eulogized in USA Today, CMT Music Connection magazine, and Taste Of Country magazine. Block is survived by his wife Jill and sons Rocky and Grady Block, Micheal Hughes and Shandon Mayes.

 Nashville Downtown Partnerships sponsored Billy Block Day concerts in 2016 and 2017.

Discography

References 

Alternative country musicians
Americana music
1955 births
2015 deaths
Musicians from Houston
Musicians from Nashville, Tennessee